College Hockey America (CHA) is a college ice hockey conference in the United States. It participates in the NCAA's Division I as a hockey-only conference. The conference is made up of five women’s teams, with two in Pennsylvania; two in New York, and one in Missouri. A former member in Pennsylvania will return in 2023.

History 
The CHA was founded as a men's-only league in the 1999–2000 season. The conference was formed by seven teams, three of which were Division I independent teams, another three moving up from Division II, after the NCAA stopped sanctioning Division II hockey in 1998, and one new varsity program (Wayne State).

The newly formed women's division of the CHA began play in the 2002–03 season with four teams. Findlay, Mercyhurst and Wayne State were former Great Lakes Women's Hockey Association members, while Niagara played previously in the ECAC.

The CHA Women's Division managed to remain at four teams between 2002–2008; although teams continued to come and go. In 2004, Findlay dropped its women's hockey program and was replaced by Quinnipiac University for one season.  In 2005, the Bobcats removed its women's team and moved to another conference (ECAC).  They were replaced by the Colonials women's ice hockey team of Robert Morris University.  In 2008–09, Syracuse University started up its women's hockey program and joined the conference; bringing the total number of teams in the CHA Women's Division up to five.

The CHA Men's Division folded after the 2009–2010 season, leaving the CHA as a women's only conference.  The fate of the four remaining CHA men's teams was as follows: Niagara and Robert Morris moved to Atlantic Hockey; Bemidji State joined the WCHA; and Alabama-Huntsville continued play as an independent, but have since moved to the WCHA.

The 2011–12 academic year and season brought many changes to the CHA. Wayne State abruptly ended their women's hockey program, dropping conference membership to only four teams again for the 2011–12 season. The conference announced that Lindenwood University would officially join the CHA for the 2012–2013 season. Lindenwood, then in the process of transitioning its athletic programs from the NAIA to the NCAA, had already been slated to play ten games against CHA opponents in its first season of NCAA competition as an independent program for the 2011–12 season. On March 19, 2012, Niagara announced it was dropping its women's ice hockey program effective immediately; as a result, the Rochester Institute of Technology team was allowed to immediately join the CHA upon its move from D-III to D-I for the 2012–13 season.  Penn State, which had announced it would upgrade its men's and women's hockey from club to NCAA Division I status for 2012, was accepted for admission to the CHA for the 2012–13 season. In sum, the CHA continued as a women's-only conference for the 2012–13 season and beyond with a total of six teams consisting of Mercyhurst (original member from 2002); Robert Morris (joined 2005); Syracuse (joined 2008) and new members Penn State, Lindenwood and RIT.

Due to financial impacts related to COVID-19, Robert Morris announced in May 2021 that it would drop its men's and women's hockey teams effective immediately. A subsequent fundraising drive with the goal of reinstating hockey was successful enough that RMU announced that December that it would reinstate both teams effective in 2023–24. RMU applied for readmission to CHA (as well as its previous men's hockey home of Atlantic Hockey), and was officially reinstated to CHA on March 3, 2022.

Current members

 Men's team joined in 2004

Future member

Former (Women's Division) members
University of Findlay Oilers, 1999-2004 (dropped program)
Quinnipiac University Bobcats, 2004–2005 (moved to ECAC)
Wayne State University Warriors, 2002–2011 (dropped program)
Niagara University Purple Eagles, 2002–2012 (dropped program)

Membership timeline

Conference arenas

CHA Tournament (Women's) history 

Prior to 2013, the CHA tournament was hosted at a predetermined site. From 2013–2015, the two first-round series were each played at the home of the higher seed, with the semifinals and final held at the home of the number one seed. In 2016, the two first round series remained as before, but the semifinals and finals were held at the LECOM Harborcenter in downtown Buffalo, New York. Starting in 2017, the two first-round series were replaced by a pair of single games, allowing all five games of the six-team tournament to be played at the LECOM Harborcenter.

NCAA postseason women's hockey history
Prior to the 2014–15 season, The CHA did not have an automatic bid to the NCAA Tournament for its conference tournament champion. At that time, with membership having remained stable at six teams (Mercyhurst, Robert Morris, Syracuse, Lindenwood, RIT, and Penn State) for two consecutive seasons, the autobid was granted.

In the table below, all NCAA appearances prior to 2015 were at-large selections.

Men's Division history
The CHA was founded in 1999 with only a men's division. Three of the seven charter members, Alabama–Huntsville, Bemidji State, and Findlay, had recently moved up from Division II, while Air Force, Army, and Niagara were formerly independent. Wayne State was a charter member, and began sponsoring varsity hockey in 2000.

Niagara went undefeated in conference play in 1999–2000, winning the conference tournament and gaining an at-large invitation to the NCAA Tournament. (The conference did not gain an automatic bid until the 2003 tournament.) Army spent only one season in the league before leaving for the MAAC. Findlay dropped its hockey programs following the 2003–2004 season, to be replaced by Robert Morris, which began play in 2004–2005. After Air Force left for Atlantic Hockey in 2006 and Wayne State dropped its program in 2008, the conference was left with only four teams. The CHA sought to add new programs to its men's league, hoping to draw interest from some of the top club teams in the country, including Kennesaw State University. However, these efforts came up short, with CHA and school personnel citing Title IX as a major hurdle in the negotiations.

On January 29, 2009, Niagara University announced that it and Robert Morris University were moving to Atlantic Hockey beginning in the 2010–11 season. Bemidji State applied again to the Western Collegiate Hockey Association for inclusion and was accepted, along with the University of Nebraska-Omaha of the Central Collegiate Hockey Association. Alabama-Huntsville applied to the CCHA following the announced departure of Nebraska-Omaha and was denied. As a result, Alabama-Huntsville began competing as an independent team beginning with the 2010–11 season. The CHA men’s division dissolved in 2010.

Member schools
There were eight member schools in total during the eleven men's seasons. The conference began in the 1999–2000 season with seven teams, and ended in 2009–2010 with four.

CHA Tournament (Men's Division)

Tournament champions were awarded the Bob Peters Cup.
Note: For the first time in conference history, the 2006 men's and women's tournaments were held at the same site: The Michigan State Fairgrounds Coliseum in Detroit, Michigan. The 2008 tournaments were also held jointly, at Dwyer Arena in Lewiston, New York.

NCAA postseason (Men's) hockey history

At-large invitee. College Hockey America was not awarded an automatic bid until 2003.

Awards
At the conclusion of each regular season schedule the coaches of each CHA team voted which players they choose to be on the three All-Conference Teams: first team, second team and rookie team. Additionally they voted to award 4 individual trophies to an eligible player at the same time. The CHA also awarded an 'Easton Three-Star Player of the Year', given to the player with the highest point total with respect to their being named a star of a game, and a Most Valuable Player in Tournament which was voted on at the conclusion of the conference tournament. All awards, with the exception of the Three-Star Player of the Year, were awarded every year of the conference's existence.

All-Conference Teams

Individual Awards

See also 
 National Collegiate Women's Ice Hockey Championship

References

External links
 

 
Companies based in Detroit
College ice hockey conferences in the United States